Gary Bizzette Mattocks (born February 23, 1931) is a former American football coach.  He served as the head football coach at Elon University from 1965 to 1966, compiling a record of 3–17.

An alumnus of East Carolina University, Mattocks was later employed by the Central Intelligence Agency. He lives in Southern Pines, North Carolina.

Head coaching record

College

References

1931 births
Living people
American football halfbacks
American football quarterbacks
Elon Phoenix football coaches
East Carolina Pirates football coaches
East Carolina Pirates football players
High school football coaches in North Carolina
People of the Central Intelligence Agency
People from Lee County, North Carolina
People from Southern Pines, North Carolina
Players of American football from North Carolina